Asia Pacific University Sports Union (APUSU) is an umbrella organization of university sports associations in the Asia-Pacific region.

History
On April 2, 2016 the first Executive Committee Meeting of the Asia Pacific University Sports Union was held in Bangkok. During the meeting held at the Eastin Sathorn Hotel (APUSU) APUSU Constitution and By-Laws were signed.

See also
 International University Sports Federation
 European University Sports Association

References

Sports governing bodies in Asia
Sports organizations established in 2016
Student sports organizations